Pseudaminic acid synthase (PseI, NeuB3) is an enzyme with systematic name phosphoenolpyruvate:2,4-bis(acetylamino)-2,4,6-trideoxy-beta-L-altropyranose transferase (phosphate-hydrolysing, 2,7-acetylamino-transferring, 2-carboxy-2-oxoethyl-forming). This enzyme catalyses the following chemical reaction

 phosphoenolpyruvate + 2,4-bis(acetylamino)-2,4,6-trideoxy-beta-L-altropyranose + H2O  5,7-bis(acetylamino)-3,5,7,9-tetradeoxy-L-glycero-alpha-L-manno-2-nonulopyranosonic acid + phosphate

The enzyme requires a divalent metal ion, preferably Mn2+ and Co2+.

References

External links 

EC 2.5.1